Phrynopus heimorum is a species of frog in the family Strabomantidae.
It is endemic to Peru.
Its natural habitats are subtropical or tropical moist montane forest and subtropical or tropical high-altitude shrubland.
It is threatened by habitat loss.

References

heimorum
Amphibians of the Andes
Amphibians of Peru
Endemic fauna of Peru
Taxonomy articles created by Polbot
Amphibians described in 2001